The highest hereditary title in the Portuguese monarchy. By tradition, there are a total of five royal and seven non-royal dukes in Portugal, out of 28 dukedoms that have ever been created. In the majority of cases, the title of duke was attributed to members of the high nobility, usually relatives of the Portuguese Royal Family, such as the second son of a monarch.

There are exceptions, like António José de Ávila, who, although not having any relation to the royal family, was given the title of duke of Ávila and Bolama.

Royal dukedoms

Hereditary royal dukedoms
Duke of Braganza (the principal grandeza of the Portuguese royal dynasty. After the restoration of a Portuguese dynasty in 1640, it became a title of the heir apparent to the crown, and passes to his heir, when he becomes king.)

Courtesy royal dukedoms
These titles were occasionally given to other infantes of the Royal Family, but did not automatically descend to their heirs:
Duke of Barcelos
Duke of Beja
Duke of Coimbra
Duke of Guarda
Duke of Guimarães
Duke of Porto
Duke of Trancoso
Duke of Viseu

Noble dukedoms
All of these dukedoms are inherited, but only some of them are titles de juro e herdade – this meant that the reigning monarch was obliged to renew the title for its rightful heir whenever a titleholder died. Only Aveiro, Lafões, Terceira, Palmela, Saldanha and Loulé were dukedoms de juro e herdade. Some of these dukes (Cadaval, Terceira and Saldanha) enjoyed Honras de Parente, i.e. certain honours (of style and/or precedence) associated with being an officially recognised relative of the king.
Before the Liberal Regime:
Duke of Aveiro and Duke of Torres Novas (both extinct in 1759, after the execution of the last duke for high treason). The first duke was the elder son of the 2nd Duke of Coimbra, the sole surviving (but illegitimate) son of King John II of Portugal;
Duke of Cadaval, family Álvares Pereira de Mello, branch of the House of Braganza before they were kings;
Duke of Caminha and Duke of Vila Real (both extinguished following executions for high treason of their titleholders for supporting the right of the Spanish Habsburg kings to the Portuguese throne after the revolution of 1640;
Duke of Lafões, families Bragança, Sousa and Menezes. The first duke was an illegitimate son of King Pedro II of Portugal. Also Count of Miranda do Corvo and Marquis of Arronches (Sousa) and Count of Cantanhede and Marquis of Marialva (Menezes) and also Duke of Miranda do Corvo (Bragança);
Duke da Vitória (this victory title, meaning in Portuguese "Duke of the Victory", was given to Arthur Wellesley, Duke of Wellington. This is the only Portuguese dukedom granted to a foreigner and whose titleholders remained foreign citizens living outside of Portugal).
After the Liberal Regime:
Duke of Terceira, 1832, Descendants of Ferdinand III of Castile, by his son, Infante Manuel of Castile. Heads of the Portuguese branch of the Manoel de Vilhena family, since the marriage of Constance Manoel with King Pedro I of Portugal. Her brother, Henrique Manoel, was brought in her entourage, and made Count of Seia, in Portugal by his brother-in-law. Following the long line of military tradition of his family, António José de Sousa Manoel de Meneses Severim de Noronha, 1st Duke of Terceira, Marquis and 7th Count of Vila Flor, was Marshal of the Army and President of the Council of Ministers.
Duke of Palmela, 1833, formerly Duke of Faial, replaced by the title of Duke of Palmela (family Sousa e Holstein), descending in the female line from the Dukes of Holstein. Also 1st Marquis of Faial, 1st Marquis of Palmela, 1st Count of Palmela and 1st Count of Calhariz. The first duke was President of the Council of Ministers and a quite remarkable ambassador in London and to the Congress of Vienna;
Duke of Saldanha, 1857, family Saldanha Oliveira e Daun. Also 1st Marquis of Saldanha, 1st Count of Saldanha and 1st Count of Almoster. The first duke was President of the Council of Ministers and Marshal of the Army;
Duke of Loulé, 1862, family Mendonça, also 8th Count of Vale de Reis and 2nd Marquis of Loulé, descending from Infanta Ana de Jesus Maria of Portugal. The first duke was President of the Council of Ministers;
Duke of Ávila and Bolama, 1878, family Ávila. First dukedom granted to a commoner. The first duke was President of the Council of Ministers;
Duke of Albuquerque, 1886, family Costa de Sousa de Macedo, also 2nd Count of Mesquitela, 5th Viscount of Mesquitela and formerly Baron of Mullingar, in Ireland.

Non-hereditary dukedoms
These titles were traditionally granted to the Lady Chamberlain (Camareira-Mor), the highest royal court office for a woman, only during her life:
Duchess of Abrantes, granted to two Marchionesses of Abrantes.
Duchess of Ficalho, to one Marchioness of Ficalho.
Duchess of Linhares, to one Countess of Linhares.
Duchess of Tancos, to one Marchioness of Tancos.

List

See also
 Portuguese nobility
 List of marquesses in Portugal
 List of countships in Portugal
 List of viscountcies in Portugal
 List of barons in Portugal

External links
Portuguese Aristocracy Titles in a Portuguese Genealogical site – Dukes

Portugal
 
 
Lists of Portuguese nobility